Landberg is a Swedish surname that may refer to
Jayce Landberg, Swedish musician, composer, record producer, lyricist and novelist
Stefan Landberg (born 1970), Swedish football coach and former midfielder
Sven Landberg (1888–1962), Swedish gymnast and football player 

Swedish-language surnames